The Lower Snake River Archaeological District is a  historic district in Franklin County, Washington and Walla Walla County, Washington, near Pasco which was listed on the National Register of Historic Places in 1984. The district covers the section of the Snake River between its confluence with the Columbia River and the Ice Harbor Dam. The listing included 14 contributing sites.

See also
Snake River Archaeological Site in Nez Perce County, Idaho, and Asotin County, Washington

References

External links

Archaeological sites in Washington (state)
Historic districts on the National Register of Historic Places in Washington (state)
National Register of Historic Places in Franklin County, Washington
National Register of Historic Places in Walla Walla County, Washington